The following highways are numbered 373:

Brazil
 BR-373

Canada
Manitoba Provincial Road 373
 Quebec Route 373
Saskatchewan Highway 373

Japan
 Japan National Route 373

United States
  Arizona State Route 373
  Florida State Road 373
  Georgia State Route 373 (former)
  Maryland Route 373
  Nevada State Route 373
  New York State Route 373
  Ohio State Route 373
  Puerto Rico Highway 373
  Farm to Market Road 373
  Virginia State Route 373
  Wyoming Highway 373